Argema kuhnei is a moth in the family Saturniidae. It is found in the Democratic Republic of the Congo, Tanzania and Zambia.

The larvae feed on Monotes katangensis.

Subspecies
A. kuhnei kuhnei Pinhey, 1969
A. kuhnei katangensis Bouyer, 2008 (Democratic Republic of the Congo)

References

Kuhnei
Moths described in 1969
Moths of Africa